Club Deportivo Zuera is a Spanish football team based in Zuera in the community of Aragón. Founded in 1923, it plays in Regional Preferente.

Season to season

9 seasons in Tercera División

External links
futbolaragon.com profile  

Football clubs in Aragon
Association football clubs established in 1923
Divisiones Regionales de Fútbol clubs
1923 establishments in Spain